The list of ship launches in 1849 includes a chronological list of some ships launched in 1849.


References

Sources

1849
Ship launches